David or Dave Shapiro may refer to:

Dave Shapiro (drummer), performer of Cinematic Sunrise
David C. Shapiro (1925–1981), American dentist and politician
David I. Shapiro (1928–2009), attorney
David L. Shapiro (born 1943), American psychologist
David Shapiro (bass player) (1952–2011), American jazz musician
David Shapiro (composer), for instance "It is Time" for The Crossing, Donald Nally's choir
David Shapiro (economist) (born 1946), American economist
David Shapiro (filmmaker), e.g. Keep the River on Your Right: A Modern Cannibal Tale (2000)
David Shapiro (music producer), for example for the Charlie Rose TV series
David Shapiro (pianist), performer of the New York Percussion Trio
David Shapiro (poet) (born 1947), American poet, literary critic and art historian
Dr. Cat (born David Shapiro), president, co-founder, executive producer and creative director of Dragon's Eye Productions
J. David Shapiro (or J.D. Shapiro, born 1969), American filmmaker and stand-up comedian
Shel Shapiro, born Norman David Shapiro, musician sometimes credited as David Shapiro (e.g. as co-author of the "Let's Live for Today" song)